Kaasiku is a village in Hiiumaa Parish, Hiiu County in northwestern Estonia.

The village is established in 1867. Historically, the village was part of Vaemla Manor.

References
 

Villages in Hiiu County